The Tehran Times is a fashion blog that was founded 2012 by Araz Fazaeli and is considered the first street fashion blog of Iran. While Fazaeli's blog aims are largely cultural and artistic—sharing Iranian street fashion with other, predominantly Western, audiences—Fazaeli also has larger motives of promoting cross-cultural understanding.  In a September 2013 interview with The Atlantic Post, Fazaeli explains these larger motives:  “I have realized that people have a wrong understanding of us. They believe what they see in the news and even though a lot of it is true there is much more to see ... That is the side that I am trying to show. I don’t think many have portrayed that about Iranian women before.”

The Tehran Times Format

Fazaeli's blog focuses on fashion as illustrated through regular street style posts showing how women interpret enforced codes of dress in Iran.  In addition to these street style posts, which appear without text and feature images of fashionably dressed women in public spaces throughout Iran, The Tehran Times also includes long-form articles by guest writers—often in both English and Persian—on topics relating to Iranian culture.  Here Fazaeli explains the inclusion of these cultural, long-form articles on the blog:  “I don’t think my responsibility is to only post photos of stylish women ... I think there are cultural norms behind fashion and there is a great history behind Iran. A combination of both could make the blog much more interesting and create stronger messages.”

Restrictions on Dress in Iran

Women in Iran are obliged to cover their hair and their bodies while in public, but recently many have been pushing these boundaries on "appropriate dress" with dramatic makeup, elaborate hairstyles, and brightly colored and more fashionable clothing.  These codes of dress are enforced by the Basij, the morality police of the Iranian regime established by Ayatollah Khomeini in 1979 after the Iranian Revolution.  In recent years, scholars have noted an increase of the ways in which youth flout these dress codes and seek to express themselves in both a social and political fashion through their styles of dress.  Fazaeli himself highlights in particular the way in which Iranian women can be seen as wearing the hijab in a way that is appropriate both politically and religiously, as well as capable of making fashion and personal statements.

Pardis Mahdavi, a scholar whose academic focus is sexual revolutions in the Middle East, argues that not only are youth subverting these codes of dress in order to assert their agency in the face of the regime's attempts at repression, but also that "this youth movement is changing the sociopolitical atmosphere Iran, and presenting the clerical members of the regime with their biggest challenge yet."  Fazaeli supports this idea of women as changing the sociopolitcal atmosphere in Iran, but also emphasizes that there is no monolithic Iranian woman and thus no monolithic approach to dress in Iran:  "Are all Iranian women miserable or are all modernized? ... The answer is that they both exist, in all societies."  With his blog, Fazaeli is merely seeking to show the multi-faceted approaches to fashion in Iran.

Since the 2013 Iranian presidential elections in which Hassan Rouhani was elected as the 7th President of Iran, many remain hopeful about the prospect of a loosening of the constraints of social rights, such as those surrounding codes of dress.  Rouhani acknowledged these demands for greater individual freedom in a tweet from his official English-language Twitter account on July 3, 2013, shortly after his election:  “If some1 doesn’t comply with rules for clothing, person’s virtue shuldn’t come under question. Our emphasis should b on virtue."

References

Iranian websites
Fashion websites
Street fashion